70th National Board of Review Awards
December 8, 1998

Best Picture: 
 Gods and Monsters 
The 70th National Board of Review Awards, honoring the best in filmmaking in 1998, were announced on 8 December 1998 and given on 8 February 1999.

Top 10 films
Gods and Monsters
Saving Private Ryan
Elizabeth
Happiness
Shakespeare in Love 
The Butcher Boy
Lolita
The Thin Red Line
A Simple Plan
Dancing at Lughnasa

Top Foreign Films
Central Station
Life Is Beautiful
The Thief
Beyond Silence
Men with Guns

Winners
Best Picture: 
Gods and Monsters
Best Foreign Film:
Central Station
Best Actor:
Ian McKellen - Gods and Monsters
Best Actress:
Fernanda Montenegro - Central Station
Best Supporting Actor:
Ed Harris - The Truman Show
Best Supporting Actress:
Christina Ricci - The Opposite of Sex
Best Acting by an Ensemble:
Happiness
Breakthrough Performance - Male:
Billy Crudup - The Hi-Lo Country
Breakthrough Performance - Female:
Angelina Jolie - Playing by Heart
Best Director:
Shekhar Kapur - Elizabeth
Best Screenplay:
Scott B. Smith - A Simple Plan
Best Documentary:
Wild Man Blues
Best Achievement in Filmmaking:
Roberto Benigni - Life Is Beautiful
Career Achievement Award:
Michael Caine
Billy Wilder Award for Excellence in Directing:
Martin Scorsese
William K. Everson Award for Film History:
John Willis
International Freedom Award:
Volker Schlöndorff
Freedom of Expression:
Bernardo Bertolucci
Special Citation:
Warren Beatty, Alan J. Pakula Memorial Award
Special Recognition for Excellence in Filmmaking:
Buffalo '66
Dark City
Love and Death on Long Island
Next Stop Wonderland
The Opposite of Sex
Passion in the Desert
Pi
Smoke Signals
Waking Ned Devine
Your Friends & Neighbors

External links
National Board of Review of Motion Pictures :: Awards for 1998

1998
1998 film awards
1998 in American cinema